Frank Becker may refer to:

 Frank J. Becker (1899–1981), U.S. Representative from New York
 Frank Becker (canoeist), former West German slalom canoeist